The Ponte Vecchio (Old Bridge) also known as the Ponte Clemente, is the oldest bridge in Cesena and a symbol of the city. The bridge spans the River Savio at one of its narrowest points. Construction work began around 1733 on the order of Pope Clement XII.

Bridges completed in 1779
Buildings and structures in Cesena
Bridges in Italy
Transport in Emilia-Romagna